The Polo Museale del Lazio (literally 'Museum Center of Lazio') is an office of Italy's Ministry of Cultural Heritage. Its seat is in Rome in the Palazzo Venezia.

History
The office was established on August 29, 2014 and started to work on December 11, 2014, acquiring and organizing museums, institutions and archaeological areas previously managed by eleven offices. Like the others Poli Museali of other regions of Italy, it depends from the Direzione Generale Musei of the same MIBACT.

The Polo Museale manages and promotes Lazio's museums, institutions, archaeological areas and other cultural sites belonging or given over to the Italian State. An important function of the office is to promote the so-called Art Bonus, a new model of tax relief connected to the world of arts which was introduced in 2014. The office defines common strategies and aims, promotes the integration and organization of museological and cultural itineraries, working together with the Segretario Regionale.

Museums, institutions, and cultural sites

The Polo Museale del Lazio manages 43 museological institutes: their chronology spans from antiquity, the Middle Ages and the modern age to the contemporary age. Some of them deal with the world of anthropology, but the major weight of the office shifts on archaeology, history, art and architecture.

A total of some 10 million per year visit institutions which are directly managed by the Polo Museale del Lazio, making it one of the most important institutions of its kind. The most visited sites are the Pantheon, Castel Sant'Angelo, the Abbey of Montecassino, Villa d'Este and Hadrian's Villa.

The following is an alphabetical list of museums, institutions and cultural sites directly managed by the Polo Museale del Lazio (parentheses indicates the province):

 Casamari Abbey – Veroli (Frosinone)
 Fossanova Abbey – Priverno (Latina)
 Montecassino Abbey – Cassino (Frosinone)
 Grottaferrata Abbey – Grottaferrata (Rome)
 Area Archeologica di Villa Adriana – Tivoli (Rome)
 Altare della Patria – Rome
 Basilica di San Cesareo de Appia – Rome
 Basilica di San Francesco – Viterbo
 Cappella dell’Annunziata – Cori (Latina)
 Casa di San Tommaso – Aquino (Frosinone)
 Certosa di Trisulti – Collepardo (Frosinone)
 Chiesa di Santa Maria Maggiore – Tuscania (Viterbo)
 Chiesa di San Pietro – Tuscania (Viterbo)
 Galleria Spada – Rome
 Istituto Italiano per l'Africa e l'Oriente (former) museum collection
 Monastero di San Benedetto Sacro Speco – Subiaco (Rome)
 Monastero di Santa Scolastica – Subiaco (Rome)
 Monumento a Vittorio Emanuele II (Vittoriano) – Rome
 Museo Archeologico dell'Agro Falisco e Forte Sangallo – Civita Castellana (Viterbo)
 Museo Archeologico Nazionale – Civitavecchia (Rome)
 Museo Archeologico Nazionale e Area Archeologica – Sperlonga (Latina)
 Museo Archeologico Nazionale di Palestrina e Santuario della Fortuna Primigenia (Rome)
 Museo Boncompagni Ludovisi per le Arti Decorative, il Costume e la Moda dei secoli XIX e XX – Rome
 Museo dell'Alto Medioevo – Rome
 Museo delle Navi Romane di Nemi (Rome)
 Museo Giacomo Manzù – Ardea (Rome)
 Museo Hendrik Christian Andersen – Rome
 Museo Mario Praz – Rome
 Museo Nazionale Archeologico Cerite – Cerveteri (Rome)
 Museo Nazionale d'Arte Orientale “Giuseppe Tucci” – Rome
 Museo Nazionale degli Strumenti Musicali – Rome
 Museo nazionale del Palazzo di Venezia e Biblioteca di Archeologia e Storia dell'Arte – Rome
 Museo Nazionale di Castel Sant'Angelo – Rome
 Museo Nazionale Etrusco di Rocca Albornoz – Viterbo
 Museo Nazionale Etrusco di Villa Giulia – Rome
 Museo Nazionale Preistorico ed Etnografico “Luigi Pigorini” – Rome
 Palazzo Altieri – Oriolo Romano (Viterbo)
 Palazzo Farnese – Caprarola (Viterbo)
 Pantheon – Roma
 Santuario Madonna della Quercia – Viterbo
 Torre di Cicerone – Arpino (Frosinone)
 Villa d'Este – Tivoli (Roma)
 Villa Giustiniani – Bassano Romano (Viterbo)
 Villa Lante Bagnaia – Viterbo

References

External links
 Official website

2014 establishments in Italy
.
Organisations based in Rome
Government of Lazio